Tetratheca pilifera is a species of flowering plant in the quandong family that is endemic to Australia.

Description
The species grows as a spreading shrub to 10–30 cm in height. The purple flowers appear from August to October.

Distribution and habitat
The range of the species lies within the Jarrah Forest and Swan Coastal Plain IBRA bioregions of south-west Western Australia, on gravelly soils on the northern and north-eastern outskirts of the city of Perth.

References

pilifera
Eudicots of Western Australia
Oxalidales of Australia
Taxa named by John Lindley
Plants described in 1840